Georgi Mikhaylovich Shchennikov (born 27 April 1991) is a Russian footballer who plays as a left defensive midfielder or left-back for CSKA Moscow. He is a son of the Olympic medalist race walker Mikhail Shchennikov.

Club career

He made his debut for the main squad in the Russian Cup game against FC Torpedo Vladimir on 6 August 2008. He came on as a substitute on 24 October 2008 in an UEFA Cup game against Deportivo La Coruña, making his debut in European competition before playing in any domestic league games. He was one of the 50 nominees in the 2011 Golden Boy awards, but was not eventually included to the short list.

On 22 November 2017, he scored his first Champions League goal in a 2–0 win over Benfica in the 2017–18 season. On 5 June 2018, Shchennikov signed a new five-year contract with CSKA Moscow. On 12 December 2018, he scored a goal in a 3–0 win over Real Madrid in the Santiago Bernabéu Stadium.

International career
Shchennikov was a part of the Russia under-21 side that competed in the 2011 European Under-21 Championship qualification. 

He made his senior national team debut on 15 August 2012 in a friendly against Ivory Coast. On 2 June 2014, he was included in the Russia's 2014 FIFA World Cup squad.

Career statistics

Honours

Club
CSKA Moscow
Russian Premier League (2): 2012–13, 2013–14
Russian Cup (3): 2008–09, 2010–11, 2012–13
Russian Super Cup (3): 2009, 2013, 2018

Individual
In the list of 33 best football players of the championship of Russia (3): 2009, 2010, 2013–14
Russian Premier League Best Young Player (1): 2009

References

External links
CSKA Moscow Profile 

1991 births
Living people
Footballers from Moscow
Russian footballers
Association football defenders
PFC CSKA Moscow players
Russian Premier League players
Russia youth international footballers
Russia under-21 international footballers
Russia international footballers
2014 FIFA World Cup players
UEFA Euro 2016 players